Asenovgrad is a town in central southern Bulgaria, part of Plovdiv Province. It is the largest town in Bulgaria that is not a province center. Previously known as Stanimaka, it was renamed in 1934 after the 13th-century tsar Ivan Asen II.

Asenovgrad also includes the districts of Gorni Voden and Dolni Voden, which until 1986 were separate villages. According to the census data of 2021, the population of the city is 47 815 people.
Above the town are the remains of the Asen Fortress, an old fortress that was strengthened under Tsar Ivan Asen II and turned into an important military post in the defense of the southern borders of the Second Bulgarian Kingdom.

The city is known for its many churches, monasteries and chapels and is often called Little Jerusalem. It is also known as the "City of Bridal Gowns" because of the large number of ateliers and shops for wedding dresses and accessories.

The majority of Asenovgrad residents are Bulgarians, with representatives of the Turkish and Romani people ethnic groups in the city.

History
Asenovgrad was founded by the Thracians as Stenímachos around 300–400 BC. In 72 BC the city was captured by the troops of the Roman Empire as part of the Roman expansion towards the Black Sea. After a long period of peace, the town was destroyed by the Goths in 251, but rebuilt later. In 395 the Roman Empire was divided into two parts and the city fell under Byzantine Empire control. Afterwards, the Slavic tribes flooded the region (until around 700 AD) and became the majority of the population.

During the wars between the Bulgarian Empire and the Byzantine Empire, the city became a major military stronghold for the Bulgarian rulers. Due to aggravation of the relationships with the Latin Empire, in 1230 Bulgarian Tsar Ivan Asen II strengthened the local fortress Stanimaka and for this reason the city was named after him in 1934 (literally city of Asen). After Bulgaria was conquered by the Ottoman Empire, Roma and Turks settled in Stanimaka, and nowadays make up 15% of the municipality of Asenovgrad's population, the rest 75% being ethnic Bulgarians and 10% – unknown and others.

The town was inhabited predominantly by Greeks (52% in 1900) up to the post-World War I population exchanges between Bulgaria and Greece. Bulgarians from various regions in Greece settled in Asenovgrad, while its Greek inhabitants went to Naousa and Kilkis in Macedonia. Naousa and Kilkis are currently sister towns of Asenovgrad.

Tane Nikolov, revolutionary and leader of the Internal Macedonian Revolutionary Organization, spent his last years in Asenovgrad and died here in 1947.

Cultural and natural sights
The city is a destination for religious and cultural tourism. Its main attractions are the monasteries St. Petka and Arapov's monastery and St. Kirik. Around the city there are 5 monasteries, 15 churches and 58 chapels (for which the city earned the nickname "The Little Jerusalem"), also there are historical, ethnographic and paleontological museums and 2 kilometers from the town is Asen's Fortress.

Outside of the town is the 40 Springs  hunting and fishing resort. The climate is very pleasant during the winter and cool in the summer, which made the city and its surroundings very attractive for tourism.   The southeast portions of the city are noted for tourist destinations and their urban development, including Parakolovo and the 40 Springs complex.

In the late twentieth century the town was known for one of the first Bulgarian discos, Jumbare, with 600 seats and a round dancing floor, it was completed in 1977 and was located in the Asenovec hotel complex, which is full recovering, but the disco no longer exists.

Asen's Fortress

The fortress has existed since the time of the Thracians, and during the Middle Ages was a main strategic point. The fortress is named after king Ivan Asen II. The church St Bogoroditsa Petrichka is the only wholly preserved building in the complex. In 1991 after a full restoration of the church, it begin to function as an orthodox temple.

The fortress is among the top 100 National tourist sights of Bulgaria and it is open during the entire year to visitors.   Thousands of people and tourist walk to the top daily to take photographs, to relax and to see the beautiful view.

Paleontological museum
The paleontological museum in the city is affiliated with the National Museum of Natural History in Bulgaria.  It was founded in 1990 and has one of the largest paleontological collections in country. Among the exhibits there are saber-toothed tiger, tiger metailurus, deinotherium, bear – indarctos and others.

Culture
The southern part of the town is known for its distilleries. Asenovgrad's wines are appreciated all over the country.

The town is famous for its numerous shops for wedding dresses and many Bulgarians come here in order to prepare for their wedding ceremonies.

Due to its specific geographical location the residents of the town enjoy a breeze called вечерник (literally "evening wind").

Twin towns — sister cities
Asenovgrad is twinned with:

 Bergama, Turkey
 Denpasar, Indonesia
 Derinkuyu, Turkey
 Dimitrovgrad, Serbia
 Kilkis, Greece
 Naousa, Greece
 Nilüfer, Turkey
 Prilep, North Macedonia
 Stary Oskol, Russia

Gallery

References

External links

 Asenovgrad – Regional information media
 Asenovgrad – Municipality
 Images from Asenovgrad
 Asenovgrad – local business

 
Populated places established in the 4th century BC
Cities and towns in the Rhodopes
Populated places in Plovdiv Province